Wuthathi, also spelt Wudhadhi, is an extinct Paman language formerly spoken on the Cape York Peninsula of Queensland, Australia, by the Wuthathi, an Aboriginal Australian people. It is unknown when it became extinct.

References 

Northern Paman languages